The Fujifilm GFX 50S II is a mirrorless medium format camera produced by Fujifilm. It is the latest camera featuring the Fujifilm G-mount. The camera, together with the X-T30 II, and some lenses, were announced by Fujifilm during the X Summit in Japan on September 2, 2021. The camera will be available for sale at the end of September 2021.

The GFX50SII has the same body as the GFX 100S featuring an improved autofocus (from the GFX 50S) and a powerful in-body image stabilization (IBIS) mechanism. 

The camera will use the 50MP sensor that is the same as the existing GFX cameras. It will have an X-Processor 4 chip used in GFX 100S.

The GFX50S II is the latest GFX camera.

See also 
 Fujifilm GFX100S
 Fujifilm GFX 50S
 Fujifilm G-mount

References

External links 

 

Fujifilm G-mount cameras
Cameras introduced in 2021